The Fisher–Schultz Lecture of the Econometric Society is an annual lecture given by a non-European member at the European meeting or, in Econometric Society World Congress years, at the World Congress. The lecture was named in honor of Irving Fisher and Henry Schultz.

2019 Victor Chernozhukov, Massachusetts Institute of Technology
2018 Matthew Gentzkow, Stanford University
2017 Janet Currie, Princeton University
2016 Mark Watson, Princeton University
2015 Darrell Duffie, Stanford University
2014 Randall Wright, University of Wisconsin-Madison
2013 Larry Samuelson, Yale University
2012 Stephen Morris, Princeton University
2011 Susan Athey, Harvard University
2010 Drew Fudenberg, Harvard University
2009 Faruk R. Gül, Princeton University
2008 Joel L. Horowitz, Northwestern University
2007 Matthew O. Jackson, Stanford University
2006 Lars Peter Hansen, University of Chicago
2005 Ariel Pakes, Harvard University
2004 Paul R. Milgrom, Stanford University
2003 Charles F. Manski, Northwestern University
2002 Douglas Gale, New York University
2001 Gary E. Chamberlain, Harvard University
2000 James J. Heckman, University of Chicago
1999 Alvin E. Roth, Harvard University
1998 David Card, University of California, Berkeley
1997 Bengt R. Holmström, Massachusetts Institute of Technology
1996 Robert F. Engle, University of California, San Diego
1995 George A. Akerlof, University of California, Berkeley
1994 Peter C. B. Phillips, Yale University
1993 Clive W. J. Granger, University of California, San Diego
1992 Robert H. Porter, Northwestern University
1991 Robert E. Lucas, Jr., University of Chicago
1990 David M. Kreps, Stanford University
1989 Angus S. Deaton, Princeton University
1988 Oliver Hart, Massachusetts Institute of Technology
1987 Joseph E. Stiglitz, Princeton University
1986 Robert B. Wilson, Stanford University
1985 Andreu Mas-Colell, Harvard University
1984 Hugo F. Sonnenschein, Princeton University
1983 Arnold Zellner, University of Chicago
1982 Jerry A. Hausman, Massachusetts Institute of Technology
1981 Peter A. Diamond, Massachusetts Institute of Technology
1980 Martin S. Feldstein, Harvard University
1979 Daniel L. McFadden, Massachusetts Institute of Technology
1978 Herbert E. Scarf, Yale University
1977 Christopher A. Sims, University of Minnesota
1976 John S. Chipman, University of Minnesota
1975 Dale W. Jorgenson, Harvard University
1974 Lionel W. McKenzie, University of Rochester
1973 Zvi Griliches, Harvard University
1972 Roy Radner, University of California, Berkeley
1971 Arthur Goldberger, University of Wisconsin, Madison
1970 Marc Nerlove, University of Chicago
1969 Gérard Debreu, University of California, Berkeley
1968 Franklin M. Fisher, Massachusetts Institute of Technology
1967 Lawrence R. Klein, University of Pennsylvania
1966 Tjalling C. Koopmans, Yale University
1965 Jacob Marschak, UCLA
1964 James Tobin, Yale University
1963 Leonid Hurwicz, University of Minnesota
1962 Robert M. Solow, Massachusetts Institute of Technology

External links 
 

Lecture series
Econometric Society